Champaner  is a historical city in the state of Gujarat, in western India. It is located in Panchmahal district, 47 kilometres from the city of Vadodara. The city was briefly the capital of the Sultanate of Gujarat.

History 
Champaner is named after Champa Bhil, a last Bhil king of Champaner. Champa Bhil built Champaner Fort. During 1405, after Champa Bhil, Rajputs occupied Champaner. By the later 15th century, the Khichi Chauhan Rajputs held Pavagadh fort above the town of Champaner. The young Sultan of Gujarat, Mahmud Begada, deciding to attack Champaner, started towards it with his army on 4 December 1482. After defeating the Champaner army, Mahmud captured the town and besieged Pavagadh, the well-known hill-fortress, above Champaner, where king Jayasimha had taken refuge. He captured the Pavagadh fort on 21 November 1484, after a siege of 20 months. He then spent 23 years rebuilding and embellishing Champaner, which he renamed Muhammadabad, after which he moved the capital there from Ahmedabad. Sultan Begada also built a magnificent Jama Masjid in Champaner, which ranks amongst the finest architectural edifices in Gujarat.  It is an imposing structure on a high plinth, with a central dome, two minarets 30 meters in height, 172 pillars, seven mihrabs, and carved entrance gates with fine latticed windows called "jalis".

In 1535, after chasing away Bahadur Shah, Humayun led 300 Mughals to scale the fort on spikes driven into rock and stonework in a remote and unguarded part of the citadel built over a precipitous hillside on Pavagadh Hill. Large heaps of gold, silver and jewels were the war bounty even though Bahadur Shah had managed to escape with a lot to Diu

Champaner is today the site of the Champaner-Pavagadh Archaeological Park, which UNESCO designated a World Heritage Site in 2004.

Religious site
The mausoleum of a holy saint Syed Khundmir is located here.

Tourism attractions 
There are total 23 places in champaner to visit.
Maa Mahakalika Temple
Jama Masjid
Saher Masjid
Nagina Masjid
Kevda Masjid
Lal Gumbaj Masjid
Kamaani Masjid
Bawaman Masjid
Khajuri Masjid

Stepwell
Jain Temple

Udan Khatola at Manchi
Saat Kaman
Amir Manzil
Champaner Fort 
Citadel Of Mahmud Beghada 
Hissar I Khas 
Khapra Zaveri Palace 
Sikandar Shah S Tomb
Virasat Van
Vada Talav

Khuniya Mahadev (Best to visit during monsoon season to enjoy waterfall near khuniya mahadev)

See also
Gujarat Sultanate
Panchmahal district

Notes

Tourism in Gujarat
Former capital cities in India
Cities and towns in Panchmahal district
Champaner-Pavagadh Archaeological Park